Schauenstein Castle is a castle in the municipality of Fürstenau of the Canton of Graubünden in Switzerland.  It is a Swiss heritage site of national significance.

See also
 List of castles in Switzerland

References

Cultural property of national significance in Graubünden
Castles in Graubünden